In Panamanian football, Liga Panameña de Fútbol is the top league followed by the LPF Liga Prom.

LPF
 Alianza FC
 Árabe Unido
 Atlético Chiriquí
 Club Deportivo del Este
 Independiente
 C.D. Plaza Amador
 Herrera F.C.
 San Francisco FC
 Sporting San Miguelito
 Tauro F.C.
 Universitario
 Veraguas C.D.

LPF Liga Prom

Teams Name Changes 
 Independiente Santa Fe to Atlético Santa Fé (1992)
 Club Deportivo La Previsora to San Francisco F.C. (1992)
 Río Mar (Puerto Armuelles) to Deportivo M&M (1993)
 Concordia FC merged with Tauro F.C. (1994)
 Sporting '89 to Sporting San Miguelito (2002)
 Sporting San Miguelito to Sporting Coclé (2002)
 River Plate FC to Colon River F.C. (2004)
 Sporting Coclé to Sporting '89´(2005)
 Sporting '89 to Sporting San Miguelito (2007)
 Chorrillito Fútbol Club to S.D. Panamá Oeste (2011)
 Deportivo El Tecal to C.D. Vista Alegre (2011)
 Santos FC (La Chorrera) to Costa del Este F.C. (2014)
 Millenium FC to Deportivo Municipal San Miguelito (2015)
 SUNTRACS F.C. to Leones de América (2016)
 C.D. Vista Alegre to Sport West FC (2016)
 Chorrillo FC to Unión Deportivo Universitario (2018)
 Atlético Veragüense to Azuero FC (2019)
 Azuero FC to Herrera FC (2021)
 Leones de América to CD Veraguas (2021)
 Costa del Este F.C. to Club Deportivo del Este (2021)

Defunct Teams

Up to First Tier 
 Bravos de Urraca / Bravos del Projusa (Santiago)
 Chepo F.C.
 Chirilanco F.C.
 Chiriquí F.C.
 CD Pan de Azúcar
 Colón C-3
 River Plate FC / Colón River FC
 Cosmos FC
 Deportivo Peru
 Ejecutivo Jr
 Eurokickers
 Municipal Colón
 Panamá Viejo F.C.
 Orión Municipal / A.D. Orión (won promotion as Linfuna team)
 Río Abajo F.C.
 Río Mar (Puerto Armuelles) / Deportivo M&M
 Santa Gema F.C.
 Sporting Colón
 Unión de San Miguelito

Up to Second Tier 
 AD América (Bugaba)
 Atlético Guadalupe (La Chorrera)
 Bocas FC
 CD Atalanta (San Sebastián, Panama City)
 Deportivo El Tecal / C.D. Vista Alegre / Sport West FC
 Club River Plate (David)
 Chiriquí Occidente F.C.
 Coclé FC
 Chorrillito FC (Arraijan)
 Deportivo Génesis (Panama City)
 Deportivo Italia (Panama City)
 F.C. Veraguas 2010
 Barraza FC / Millenium UP / Millenium FC / Deportivo Municipal San Miguelito 
 New York FC (Colón)
 Sabanitas FC (Colón)
 Paraiso FC / Tierra Firme FC

 
Panama
Football clubs in Panama
Football clubs